Hole Railway Station was a small halt on the North Devon and Cornwall Junction Light Railway in the U.K. between Torrington and Halwill Junction, serving villages such as Black Torrington, Highampton and Sheepwash. The line, which opened in 1925, was a private line until it became part of the Southern Region of British Railways in 1948. The line closed in 1965 as part of the Beeching proposals, freight services having been withdrawn earlier on this section of the line.

References

See also 
List of closed railway stations in Britain
The Colonel Stephens Society

Disused railway stations in Devon
Former Southern Railway (UK) stations
Railway stations in Great Britain opened in 1925
Railway stations in Great Britain closed in 1965
Beeching closures in England
Torridge District